NU Pavonis is a variable star in the southern constellation of Pavo. With a nominal apparent visual magnitude of 4.95, it is a faint star but visible to the naked eye. It is moving closer with a heliocentric radial velocity of −10 km/s.

This is an aging red giant with a stellar classification of M6 III, currently on the asymptotic giant branch. It is a semiregular variable star of sub-type SRb that ranges in magnitude from 4.91 down to 5.26 with a period of 60 days. The star has expanded to 204 times the Sun's radius and is radiating 7,412 times the Sun's luminosity from its enlarged photosphere at an effective temperature of 3,516 K. Far-ultraviolet emission has been detected from these coordinates, which may be coming from a companion star.

References

M-type giants
Semiregular variable stars
Asymptotic-giant-branch stars
Pavo (constellation)
Durchmusterung objects
189124
098608
7625
Pavonis, NU